The Instituto Nacional de Biodiversidad (INBio) is the national institute for biodiversity and conservation in Costa Rica. Created at the end of the 1980s, and despite having national status, it is a privately run institution that works closely with various government agencies, universities, business sector and other public and private entities inside and outside of the country. The goals of the institute are to complete an inventory of the natural heritage of Costa Rica, promote conservation and identify chemical compounds and genetic material present in living organisms that could be used by industries such as pharmaceuticals, cosmetics or others.

The institute has a collection of over three million insects representing tens of thousands of species all recorded in Atta, a computer database that contains all of the data such as exact location (including GPS coordinates), date of collection, name of the collector and method of collection.

Due to impending insolvency, in March 2015, the INBio's biodiversity collection and database will be taken over by the state (and returned to the Natural History Museum, from which much of it was taken when INBio was founded), and its theme park converted to government operation. INBio will move forward as a "think tank" type institute with money raised from transfer of most of its assets to the government.

History 
Costa Rica decided in 1989 that some sort of organization was necessary to study the biodiversity of Costa Rica. The government did not have the ability at the time to fund a new organization so a handful of scientists and entrepreneurs took the initiative and created the non-profit organization now known as INBio. Among the founders of the institution was Rodrigo Gámez, a remarkable and well known Costa Rican scientist who has a strong desire for teaching people about the importance of biodiversity and its conservation. He received the MAGÓN award (Premio Nacional de Cultura Magón) in 2012, which is an award of great importance that is given every year to someone who has contributed to Costa Rica, in this case related to science. In that same year he received an international award known as the MIDORI prize, given to him in Japan, by a Japanese institution; he has also received a great number of other awards in the past. Rodrigo Gámez is still president at the institution.

In 1995 INBio was awarded the Prince of Asturias Award for Technical and Scientific Research.

Structure 
There are many different components to INBio such as Bio-prospecting, INBioparque, INBio editorial, and the many different research areas such as arthropods, fungi, and plants. Bio-prospecting is the division dealing with finding useful products from the specimens collected. INBio has worked with organizations such as Merck, Bristol-Myers Squibb, and the University of Massachusetts Amherst. The research programs vary from studying the spider family Oonopidae to compiling a book with all of the genera of known and described flies in Central America. Such a project has never been done in a tropical place with such a large biodiversity.

Areas of activity 
The Institute's work has chiefly developed in the following areas:

Inventory and monitoring 
Generating information on the diversity of the country's species and ecosystems. It currently owns a collection of more than 3 million specimens, each identified and cataloged, including arthropods, plants, fungi and mollusks. Furthermore, information on the country's different ecosystems is generated.

Conservation
Integrating the information generated by INBio into decision-making processes for the protection and sustainable use of its biodiversity, for both the public and private sectors. INBio works closely with SINAC (Sistema de Áreas de Conservación; Conservation Areas System), being considered a strategic partner in the protection of the country's protected areas.

Communication and education 
Sharing information and understanding of biodiversity with different sectors of the public, seeking to create a wider knowledge of its value. Most of this effort is centered in the INBiopark, a theme-park opened in 2000 which aims to bring families and visitors closer to the rich Costa Rican nature. Furthermore, through other methods INBio looks to strengthen the environmental component of the Costa Rican population's actions and decisions.

Bioinformatics
Developing and applying technological tools to support the process of generation, administration, analysis and dissemination of information on biodiversity. The information on each specimen in the biodiversity inventory can be found in a database named Atta, accessible to the public through INBio's webpage.

Bioprospecting
Searching for sustainable, commercially applicable uses of the resources of biodiversity. INBio has been a pioneering institution in establishing research agreements for the search for chemical substances, genes, etc., present in plants, insects, marine organisms and microorganisms, which could be used by the pharmaceutical, medical, biotechnology, cosmetics, nutritional and agricultural industries. INBio, although it is a national initiative given its scope, has become an international force for trying to integrate conservation and development. The application of scientific knowledge of biodiversity to economic activities such as ecotourism, medicine, agriculture or the development of mechanisms of collection and payment for environmental services exemplify this force for integration, and are part of the activities which attract the attention of the international community.

References 

Institutions of Costa Rica
Nature conservation in Costa Rica
Nature conservation organizations based in North America